Type 2 or Type II may refer to:

 Type II, a Japanese submachine gun
 Type 2 12 cm Mortar, a Japanese weapon
 Type 2 20 mm AA machine cannon, a Japanese weapon
 Type 2 AT mine
 Type 2 cannon, a 30 mm Japanese weapon
 Type 2 encryption
 Type II female genital mutilation
 Type-2 Gumbel distribution
 Type 2 Ho-I, a Japanese tank
 Type 2 Ka-Mi, a Japanese tank
 Type II keratin
 Type II error used in statistics for a "false negative" error
 Type II lattice
 Type II string theory
 Type-II superconductor
 Type II supernova
 Type 2 sequence
 Activin type 2 receptors
 Atelosteogenesis, type II
 Belgian State Railways Type 2 - class of 0-6-0 locomotives built 1874–1884
 British Railways Type 2 Diesel locomotives
 Diabetes mellitus type 2
 German Type II submarine
 Glutaric acidemia type 2
 Glycogen storage disease type II
 Hyper-IgM syndrome type 2
 Hyperfinite type II factor
 Type 2 connector
 IEC 62196 Type 2 connector type (alias Mennekes Type 2)
 JDBC type 2 driver
 Kawanishi H8K, Type 2 flying boat (code named Emily)
 Motorola Type II
 Multiple endocrine neoplasia type 2
 Neurofibromatosis type II
 R-Type II
 Type I and type II errors
 Type II civilization, an advanced civilization on the Kardashev scale.
 Volkswagen Type 2 (T3)
 Volkswagen Type 2
Peugeot Type 2
 IEC Type II, one of the four "type" classifications of audio cassette formulation

Type 2 may also refer to
 Albinism
 Charcot–Marie–Tooth disease
 Chomsky hierarchy
 Compact Font Format
 CompactFlash
 Cyclic permutation
 Dbx (noise reduction)
 Gaucher's disease
 Hypersensitivity
 PC Card 
 Second-degree atrioventricular block
 Spinal muscular atrophy
 Topoisomerase
 Usher syndrome
 Von Willebrand disease